The University of Utah presidents include all sixteen men and women who served as president of the University of Utah or its predecessor the University of Deseret, which was founded in 1850 just a few years after the Mormon Pioneers arrived in the Salt Lake Valley.

List of presidents
According to the university's official count the current president, Taylor Randall, is the 17th president of the University. The university only counts the presidents that have served since the name was officially changed to the University of Utah, starting with John R. Park. The count also only counts the presidents, not the actual terms, because Joseph T. Kingsbury was president two different times.

Timeline of presidential terms

References